Justus H. Schwab (1847–1900) was the keeper of a radical saloon in New York City's Lower East Side. An emigre from Germany, Schwab was involved in early American anarchism in the early 1880s, including the anti-authoritarian New York Social Revolutionary Club's split from the Socialistic Labor Party and Johann Most's entry to the United States.

Life 

Justus H. Schwab was born in Germany in 1847. His father was a Forty-Eighter. Schwab immigrated into the United States in 1868. He ran a saloon in New York City's Lower East Side (50 East First Street) that was popular among radicals. Emma Goldman and the periodical Sturmvogel used the saloon as their mailing address. Writers including Ambrose Bierce, Sadakichi Hartmann, and James Huneker also frequented the bar. The bar was advertised as "the gathering-place for all bold, joyful, and freedom-loving spirits".

A financial panic in 1873 set off an economic depression that lasted the rest of the decade with progressively worsening unemployment, homelessness, starvation, and general hardship. This depression gave rise to the American militant labor movement with demonstrations by the afflicted. As one such January 1874 demonstration in Tompkins Square Park devolved, Schwab walked towards the square with the Paris Commune's red flag, for which he was arrested for incitement to riot. He sang "The Marseillaise" during his arrest. 

Schwab was cast out of the Socialistic Labor Party for opposing alliance with the Greenback Party in the 1880 election. He was involved in the formation of the splinter New York Social Revolutionary Club to pursue the Gotha Program in late 1880. Schwab represented the club at the 1881 Chicago Social Revolutionary Congress, where he was a key figure. Schwab spoke at the Social Revolutionary Club's reception for Johann Most's arrival in New York. Schwab became an anarchist in early 1880s, a term that emerged during this period and was synonymous with social revolutionary, anti-authoritarian socialism.

Schwab kept correspondence with Albert Parsons during the latter's imprisonment. Parsons carved a tugboat with his pocketknife and asked Schwab to raffle it with proceeds to go to Parsons' family, which it did, for $150.

Personal life 

Schwab was tall, with thick blond hair "like a Viking" and a deep voice.

References

Bibliography

Further reading 

 
 
 
 
 
 
 
 
 

1847 births
1900 deaths
American anarchists
American bartenders
People from Frankfurt
People from the Lower East Side
German emigrants to the United States
Taverns in New York City